Marcus Astvald (born 3 September 1990) is a Swedish footballer who plays as a left midfielder or forward for BK Forward.

Career

Degerfors IF
On 26 November 2018, Degerfors IF announced that they had re-signed Astvald for the 2019 season on a free transfer. Astvald signed for two year.

References

External links

1990 births
Living people
Swedish footballers
Sweden youth international footballers
Sweden under-21 international footballers
Association football midfielders
Örebro SK players
Degerfors IF players
IK Brage players
Levanger FK players
Östers IF players
BK Forward players
Allsvenskan players
Superettan players
Norwegian First Division players
Swedish expatriate footballers
Expatriate footballers in Norway
Swedish expatriate sportspeople in Norway
Sportspeople from Örebro